Frances Kruk is a contemporary Polish-Canadian poet living in London, UK. She completed her PhD at Royal Holloway, University of London, under the supervision of Redell Olsen. Recent writing can be found in journals such as Damn the Caesars, Sous les Pavés, onedit, fhole, ditch, and HOW2. She has exhibited visual work and performed solo and collaborative poetry, music, and interdisciplinary projects in various parts of Canada, USA, Cyprus, Ireland, and the UK. She edited the occasional micropress yt communication with Sean Bonney.

Works
Shift & Switch: New Canadian Poetry (Mercury Press, 2005)
clobber (yt communication, 2006)
dig oubliette (yt communication, 2006)
A Discourse on Vegetation & Motion (Critical Documents, 2008)
Infinite Difference: Other Poetries by UK Women Poets (Shearsman, 2010)
Down you go, or, Négation de bruit (Punch Press, 2011)
DWARF SURGE (yt communication, 2013)
PIN (yt communication, 2014)
lo-fi frags in progress (Veer, 2015)

Selected performances
Tar Disaster Project – Planetarium One (Calgary, 2002)
Tar Disaster Project – Jazz Festival Calgary (Calgary, 2003) 
High Performance Rodeo/Mutton Busting (Calgary, 2004)
Crossing the Line (London, 2006–2009)
Opened (London, 2006–2008)
Calgary International Spoken Word Festival (Calgary, 2005)
TEST (Toronto, 2007)
The Program (Providence, Rhode Island, 2007)
Just Buffalo (Buffalo, New York, 2007)
PerformingIdentity/Crossing Borders (Nicosia, 2007)
SoundEye Festival (Cork, 2008–2009)
textmusictext (London, 2009)
The Other Room (Manchester, 2009)
Greenwich Cross-Genre Festival (London, 2010) 
Cambridge Reading Series (Cambridge, 2010)

Exhibitions
Selected paintings - The Stephen Lawrence Gallery (London, 2010)
Thought Process – photo and text installation at The Little Gallery, with photographer Anna Mandelkau (Calgary, 2004)
a day in the life of particle girl coming to terms with her anger at the rules of gravity - mixed media art/performance installation, The Little Gallery (Calgary, AB 2004)

References

External links
Dark mucus
Robert Sheppard, Scott Thurston, "Editorial" (Journal of British and Irish Innovative Poetry, vol. 1, no. 1, September 2009, pp. 3–9).
Keith Tuma, "Some Younger British Poets" (Chicago Review 53:1, Spring 2007).
David Grundy, Review of Down You Go; Or, Négation de Bruit in Hix Eros 3

21st-century Canadian poets
Canadian women poets
Canadian people of Polish descent
Living people
21st-century Canadian women writers
Year of birth missing (living people)